John Murphy was an English professional footballer who played as an outside right.

Career
Murphy joined Bradford City from Stoke in January 1904, having been playing for Stoke's reserve team in the Birmingham & District League. He made 1 league and 5 FA Cup appearances for the club. He left the club in 1904.

Sources

References

Date of birth missing
Date of death missing
English footballers
Stoke City F.C. players
Bradford City A.F.C. players
English Football League players
Association football outside forwards